Jump to It is the twenty-eighth studio album by American singer Aretha Franklin, produced by Luther Vandross and released on July 26, 1982, by Arista Records.

Background
Jump to It gave Franklin her tenth number one R&B album – at the time it was the all-time record. It enjoyed a seven-week run at number one on Billboards R&B albums chart and also reached number 23 on Billboards Pop albums chart. It was hailed as a comeback album, given that it provided Franklin with her first Gold-certified disc and Top 40 Pop song since Sparkle in 1976.

The title track, "Jump to It", was Franklin's first Top 40 Pop hit since 1976, and her first number one R&B hit since 1977's "Break It to Me Gently". "Jump to It" was nominated for a Grammy Award. The album itself received an American Music Award for Best Soul Album in 1983.

Commercial performance
On February 1, 1983, Jump to It was certified Gold by the RIAA. Franklin was presented her framed Gold record in Detroit by her long-time friends the Four Tops. In 2005, Patrick Alavi released "Come to Me", which used a sample of "Jump to It".

Track listing

Personnel

Performers

 Aretha Franklin – lead vocals, rhythm arrangements (6, 7, 8), vocal arrangements (6, 7, 8)
 Nat Adderley Jr. – keyboards (1, 3–8), rhythm arrangements (3–8)
 Marcus Miller – synthesizers (1), synthesizer and rhythm arrangements (1), bass guitar (1, 2, 4–7), keyboards (2)
 Luther Vandross – backing vocals (1, 2, 5), keyboards (2), rhythm arrangements (2, 4, 5, 7), vocal arrangements (2, 3, 5, 8)
 George Duke – acoustic piano (5)
 Reginald "Sonny" Burke – keyboards (8)
 Doc Powell – guitar (1–8)
 Steve Love – guitar solo (7)
 Francisco Centeno – bass guitar (3)
 Louis Johnson – bass guitar (8)
 Yogi Horton – drums (1, 3–8)
 Buddy Williams – drums (2)
 Errol "Crusher" Bennett – congas (1), percussion (3, 4, 5, 8)
 Paulinho da Costa – percussion (7)
 Paul Riser – string arrangements (2, 4, 6), horn arrangements (4, 6)
 Leon Pendarvis – horn and string arrangements (3, 5, 8)
 Jerry Hey – horn and string arrangements (7)
 George Young – soprano saxophone (4)
 Brenda White – backing vocals (1, 2)
 Cissy Houston – backing vocals (1, 3, 5, 8)
 Fonzi Thornton – backing vocals (1, 2)
 Michelle Cobbs – backing vocals (1, 2)
 Phillip Ballou – backing vocals (1, 2)
 Tawatha Agee – backing vocals (1, 2)
 Norma Jean Wright – backing vocals (2)
 Alexandra Brown – backing vocals (3)
 Darlene Love – backing vocals (3, 5, 8)
 Paulette McWilliams – backing vocals (3)
 Stephanie Spruill – backing vocals (3, 5, 8)
 Brenda Corbett – backing vocals (5, 7)
 Four Tops – backing vocals and vocal arrangements (6)
 Levi Stubbs – lead vocals (6)
 Erma Franklin – backing vocals (7)
 Pam Vincent – backing vocals (7)
 Sandra Dance – backing vocals (7)

Production
 Producers – Luther Vandross (tracks 1–5, 7 & 8); Aretha Franklin (track 6).
 Production coordination – Sephra Herman
 Recorded and mixed by Michael Brauer
 Additional engineers – Carl Beatty and Lee Keifer
 Assistant engineers – Michael Christopher, Karat Faye, John Hanlon, Harry Spiridakis, Don Wershba and Warren Woods.
 Recorded at Mediasound Studios (New York, NY), Record Plant (Los Angeles, CA), The Village Recorder (Los Angeles, CA) and Soundsuite (Detroit, MI).
 Music contractors – Sephra Herman and Trevor Veitch
 Art direction and design – Ria Lewerke-Shapiro
 Photography – Harry Langdon
 Lettering – Sue Reilly

See also
List of number-one R&B albums of 1982 (U.S.)

References

External links

Aretha Franklin albums
Albums produced by Luther Vandross
Albums arranged by Paul Riser
Arista Records albums